Alain Michel (born 23 February 1953) in Montelimar is a French sidecar racer and motorcycle preparer. He is the only French World Sidecar Champion.

The career of Alain Michel  began on 2 wheels 1972. He also won this year's Cup Four Seasons category on a Honda 450 and finished in second place in the championship of France 500 national.

Considering this experience as inconclusive, he embarked on three wheels 1975 and in 1976 began to a career Grand Prix category sidecar in which he obtained some good results.

His first Grand Prix victory, he won in France at Paul Ricard in 1977, with Gérard Lecorre as a passenger. That year would be marked by a classic race in the rain at Silverstone (England) but would result in abandonment. They finished 5th in the World Championship.

In 1978, the team ended runner-up in the world with its new passenger Stuart Collins earned after two victories.

1979 a new "monkey" took place in the basket; Michael Burkhard. The crew had two victories at Mans and Assen and a 4th-place finish in the World Championship.

In 1980, 1981 and 1982 the crew won four victories, many podiums and finished respectively 2, 3 and 4 in the championships those years.

1984 with Jean-Marc Fresc in the "basket" and still the 3rd position in the world at the end of the season before having a "catastrophic" season 1985.

In 1986 Michel and Fresc struggled all season against the crew of Streuer and Schnieders. A 5th place at Hockenheim (Germany) because of a loose headphone lost the crew valuable points for the championship final, they would be perfectly equal on the number of points. But thanks to 5 wins against 2 to the French crew, it is the Dutch team that are world champions.

Undeterred, Alain Michel and Jean-Marc Fresc went on to fight in 1987 with 5 podiums in 1988 still 4th with 2 podiums, then 1989 3rd in the championship with three podiums.

In 1990 it is the dedication with his passenger Simon Birchall and the title of world champion sidecar, won on a LCR-Krauser.

Another season in 1991, the 16th at the highest level and Alain Michel finally hangs up the leathers and helmet. Meanwhile, during this period, he has won 9 titles of Champion of France in the category.

Among other activities, he continued for some time to be with the world of motorcycle racing, taking care to develop machines enduro, or designing with his friend Claude Fior, motorcycle Grand Prix suspension.

Honours 
 World Champion 1990.
 Vice-world champion in 1978, 1981 and 1986.
 Champion of France (9 titles)
 16 seasons at the highest level.
 138 Grands Prix contested.
 77 Podiums.
 18 Wins.
 43 Pole positions and lap records.

References

External links
 http://www.f1network.net/main/s180/st33791.htm
 https://commons.wikimedia.org/wiki/File:Alain_Michel_et_Jean-Marc_Fresc_sur_LCR_Krauser.jpg
 http://www.hahn-archiv.de/0492fb99e30dbf50a/index.html

French motorcycle racers
1953 births
Sidecar racers
Living people